Cibola High School (CHS) is a public senior high school located in northwest Albuquerque, New Mexico in the Albuquerque Public Schools District. Due to rapid population growth in the surrounding area, Cibola was the largest high school in New Mexico as of 2006 and was considered overcrowded with over 3,200 students and 62 portable classrooms. School enrollment was reduced in 2007 with the opening of nearby Volcano Vista High School. In 2008, CHS underwent a massive remodel and expansion of the main building. The current enrollment stands at 2,197.

School grade

The NMPED (New Mexico Public Education department) replaced the No Child Left Behind Act and AYP testing with a new school grading formula, which took effect for the 2010-2011 school year. The grade is calculated using many forms of testing, and includes graduation rates.

Demographics

Athletics
Cibola competes in the New Mexico Activities Association (NMAA), as a class 6A school in District 1. In 2014, the NMAA realigned the state's schools in to six classifications and adjusted district boundaries.  In addition to Cibola High School, the schools in District 1-6A include: V. Sue Cleveland High School, Volcano Vista High School, Rio Rancho High School and Santa Fe High School.

Notable alumni
 Alan Branch, NFL defensive lineman
 Carlos Condit, mixed martial arts fighter competing in the UFC
 Erik Cook, NFL offensive lineman
 Ryan Cook, NFL offensive lineman
 Christian Cunningham (born 1997), basketball player in the Israeli Basketball Premier League
 Rosie Jones, professional golfer
 John Roskos, former MLB player (Florida Marlins, San Diego Padres)
Gadi Schwartz, news correspondent
 Kevin A. Short, painter
 Melanie Stansbury, US House of Representatives (NM-1)
 Mike Vento, former MLB player (New York Yankees, Washington Nationals)
 Xzibit, rapper, actor, and MTV host

References

External links 
 

Educational institutions established in 1974
High schools in Albuquerque, New Mexico
Public high schools in New Mexico
1974 establishments in New Mexico